The Off-Site Source Recovery Project (OSRP) is a U.S. government project funded by the Department of Energy at Los Alamos National Laboratory.  The OSRP's mission is to remove excess, unwanted, abandoned, or orphan radioactive sealed sources that pose a potential risk to health, safety, and national security.

This government project had its beginnings in the Energy Department's early Environmental Management program. Environmental management was intended to clean up environmental contamination and dispose of vast quantities of radioactive and hazardous waste stemming from several decades of nuclear weapons design, research, testing and production.

One of the issues faced by the early Environmental Management program was substantial amounts of radioactive and hazardous materials at universities and other locations left over from contracts and grants into various aspect of nuclear technology research. The Energy Department began addressing this problem with a low-budget effort called the Offsite Waste Program.

The initial scope of the OSR Project included all Greater than Class C (GTCC) sealed sources. However, since September 11, 2001, the mission expanded from environmental concerns to public safety and national security. As a result, OSRP direction and oversight moved from the Department of Energy's (DOE) Office of Environmental Management, to the National Nuclear Security Administration in 2003.

The project mainly addresses sources containing americium and plutonium.  The recently expanded mission also includes recovery of beta or gamma emitting sources, like caesium and strontium.

OSRP has been able to recover more than 45,000 sources from nearly 1588 sites all 50 States, the DC area, Puerto Rico and 50 foreign countries.

External links
Official OSRP site

United States Department of Energy agencies